Thorella  may refer to:
 Thorella (crustacean), a genus of shrimp in the family Hippolytidae
 Thorella, a genus of flowering plants in the family Apiaceae; synonym of Caropsis